Daniel Horton (born April 21, 1984) is an American professional basketball player. He is a 6'3" 205 lb guard.

Born in Baton Rouge, Louisiana, Horton graduated in 2002 from Cedar Hill High School in Cedar Hill, a suburb of Dallas, Texas and was named to the 2002 McDonald's High School All-American team.

His brother is Jason Horton, that went to Missouri and has now graduated and is waiting to go play professionally. In 2004 two years after Daniel graduated Jason lead the Cedar Hill Longhorns to the state championship.

College career
Horton played four seasons for University of Michigan (UM), from 2002 to 2006. He was voted  to the All-Big Ten First Team by the media. He was voted All-Big Ten Second Team (by coaches). He was the 2004 NIT MVP. He was named 2003 Big Ten Freshman of the Year. He was named to the 2003 All-Big Ten Second Team. Finished 11th on Michigan's all-time scoring list (1,614).

While at Michigan, Horton averaged 14.7 points, 4.4 assists, 2.6 rebounds and 1.70 steals.  As a senior, Horton earned many of UM's yearly awards including the Bill Buntin Most Valuable Player Award, the Wayman Britt Outstanding Defensive Player Award, the Gary Grant Award for Most Assists, the Outstanding Free Throw Shooting Award and the Iron Man Award while averaging 17.6 points, 5.3 assists, 2.6 rebounds and 1.94 steals while also leading the Wolverines in scoring, assists and steals.  Horton finished his career second all-time in school history in steals (187), three-point field goals (233) and three-point fields goals attempted (651) while placing fourth all-time with 484 assists.

Pro career

After going undrafted the 2006 NBA Draft, he was signed by the Miami Heat during the 2007 preseason.

He played only one game and was waived by the Heat in October 2006, and then moved to Turkey and signed for the Turkish Premier league team Pınar Karşıyaka.

He left after a couple of months after not receiving his wages from his team, so the Los Angeles D-Fenders signed him in February 2007.

One year later, he left for France and signed for the Ligue Nationale de Basketball team Hyères-Toulon Var Basket. In 2012, he signed with the Bendigo Braves in the SEABL (South East Australia Basketball League). In August 2012, Daniel Horton signed a contract to play in Finland with Korihait.

He is married with two children; his wife and the children live in Arkansas.

Notes

External links
NBA.com player bio
basketball-reference.com NBDL bio
ESPN.com player bio
NBADRAFT.net player bio
Finnish League profile

1984 births
Living people
American expatriate basketball people in Australia
American expatriate basketball people in Finland
American expatriate basketball people in France
American expatriate basketball people in Turkey
Basketball players from Louisiana
Basketball players from Dallas
Élan Béarnais players
HTV Basket players
Karşıyaka basketball players
Los Angeles D-Fenders players
McDonald's High School All-Americans
Michigan Wolverines men's basketball players
Parade High School All-Americans (boys' basketball)
Point guards
Shooting guards
American men's basketball players